The men's 50 metre butterfly event at the 2015 European Games in Baku took place on 23 June at the Aquatic Palace.

Results

Heats
The heats were started at 09:38.

Semifinals
The semifinals were started at 17:37.

Semifinal 1

Semifinal 2

Final
The final was held at 19:04.

References

Men's 50 metre butterfly